Riccardo Agostini (born 20 April 1994 in Padua) is an Italian racing driver.

Career

Karting
Agostini began karting in 2000 and raced primarily in his native Italy for the majority of this part of career, working his way up from the junior ranks to progress through to the KF2 category by 2010 and finishing 12th in CIK-FIA European Championship.

Formula Abarth
In 2010, Agostini graduated to single–seaters into the newly launched Formula Abarth series in Italy, stating with Prema Junior. He won the feature race in Imola and finished the season eleventh. Agostini stayed in Formula Abarth for a second season in 2011 but switched to debutants Villorba Corse, when the series split in European and Italian series. After four rounds he had another switch to JD Motorsport. Despite having just one podium in both Italian and European Series he improved to seventh and eighth respectively.

Italian Formula Three
In 2012 Agostini continued his collaboration with JD Motorsport into Italian Formula Three Championship.

Formula One
On 9 November 2012 Agostini tested a Scuderia Ferrari Formula One car as a prize for claiming the Rookie title in Italian Formula Three.

Racing record

Career summary

† As Agostini was a guest driver, he was ineligible for championship points.

Complete Auto GP results
(key) (Races in bold indicate pole position) (Races in italics indicate fastest lap)

Complete FIA European Formula 3 Championship results
(key)

† Driver did not finish the race, but was classified as he completed over 90% of the race distance.

Complete GP3 Series results
(key) (Races in bold indicate pole position) (Races in italics indicate fastest lap)

References

External links
 
 

1994 births
Living people
Sportspeople from Padua
Italian racing drivers
Formula Abarth drivers
Formula Masters China drivers
Italian Formula Three Championship drivers
Auto GP drivers
World Series Formula V8 3.5 drivers
FIA Formula 3 European Championship drivers
Italian GP3 Series drivers
International GT Open drivers
Manor Motorsport drivers
Prema Powerteam drivers
JD Motorsport drivers
MP Motorsport drivers
Zeta Corse drivers
Hilmer Motorsport drivers
EuroInternational drivers
Wayne Taylor Racing drivers
Audi Sport drivers
Lamborghini Super Trofeo drivers